In molecular biology a selenoprotein is any protein that includes a selenocysteine (Sec, U, Se-Cys) amino acid residue. Among functionally characterized selenoproteins are five glutathione peroxidases (GPX) and three thioredoxin reductases, (TrxR/TXNRD) which both contain only one Sec. Selenoprotein P is the most common selenoprotein found in the plasma.  It is unusual because in humans it contains 10 Sec residues, which are split into two domains, a longer N-terminal domain that contains 1 Sec, and a shorter C-terminal domain that contains 9 Sec.  The longer N-terminal domain is likely an enzymatic domain, and the shorter C-terminal domain is likely a means of safely transporting the very reactive selenium atom throughout the body.

Species distribution 

Selenoproteins exist in all major  domains of life, eukaryotes, bacteria and archaea. Among eukaryotes, selenoproteins appear to be common in animals, but rare or absent in other phyla -one has been identified in the green alga Chlamydomonas, but almost none in other plants or in fungi. The American cranberry (Vaccinium macrocarpon Ait.) is the only land plant known to possess sequence-level machinery for producing selenocysteine in its mitochondrial genome, although its level of functionality is not yet determined. Among bacteria and archaea, selenoproteins are only present in some lineages, while they are completely absent in many other phylogenetic groups. These observations have recently been confirmed by whole genome analysis, which shows the presence or absence of selenoprotein genes and accessory genes for the synthesis of selenoproteins in the respective organism.

Types 

Besides the selenocysteine-containing selenoproteins, there are also some selenoproteins known from bacterial species, which have selenium bound noncovalently. Most of these proteins are thought to contain a selenide-ligand to a molybdopterin cofactor at their active sites (e.g. nicotinate dehydrogenase of Eubacterium barkeri, or xanthine dehydrogenases). Selenium is also specifically incorporated into modified bases of some tRNAs (as 2-seleno-5-methylaminomethyl-uridine).

In addition, selenium occurs in proteins as unspecifically incorporated selenomethionine, which replaces methionine residues. Proteins containing such unspecifically incorporated selenomethionine residues are not regarded as selenoproteins. However, replacement of all methionines by selenomethionines is a widely used, recent technique in solving the phase problem during X-ray crystallographic structure determination of many proteins (MAD-phasing). While the exchange of methionines by selenomethionines appears to be tolerated (at least in bacterial cells), unspecific incorporation of selenocysteine in lieu of cysteine seems to be highly toxic. This may be one reason for the existence of a rather complicated pathway of selenocysteine biosynthesis and specific incorporation into selenoproteins, which avoids the occurrence of the free amino acid as intermediate. Thus, even if a selenocysteine-containing selenoprotein is taken up in the diet and used as selenium source, the amino acid must be degraded prior to synthesising a new selenocysteine for incorporation into a selenoprotein.

Clinical significance 

Selenium is a vital nutrient in animals, including humans. About 25 different selenocysteine-containing selenoproteins have so far been observed in human cells and tissues. Since lack of selenium deprives the cell of its ability to synthesize selenoproteins, many health effects of low selenium intake are believed to be caused by the lack of one or more specific selenoproteins. Three selenoproteins,  TXNRD1 (TR1), TXNRD2 (TR3) and glutathione peroxidase 4 (GPX4), have been shown to be essential in mouse knockout experiments. On the other hand, too much dietary selenium causes toxic effects and can lead to selenium poisoning. The threshold between essential and toxic concentrations of this element is rather narrow with a factor in the range of 10-100.

Examples 

Human selenoproteins include:

 Iodothyronine deiodinases 1-3: DIO1, DIO2, DIO3
 Glutathione peroxidases: GPX1, GPX2, GPX3, GPX4, GPX6
 Selenoproteins: SelH (C11orf31), SelI (EPT1), SelK, SelM, SelN (SEPN1), SelO, SelP (SEPP1), SelR (MSRB1), SelS, SelT, SelV, SelW (SEPW1), Sel15
 Selenophosphate synthetase 2 (SEPHS2, SPS2)
 Thioredoxin reductases 1-3: TXNRD1, TXNRD2, TXNRD3

See also
 SECIS element
Mercury poisoning

References

Further reading